Lauren Kassell (born 30 July 1970) is Professor of History of Science and Medicine at the University of Cambridge and a Fellow of Pembroke College, Cambridge. Since September 2021, she is on leave from Cambridge to serve as the Professor in History of Science at the European University Institute (Florence). She completed a doctorate at the University of Oxford in 1997. She is known for her work on the history of astrology and medicine in early modern England.

Kassell directed the Casebooks project to digitise the medical records of the astrologers Simon Forman and Richard Napier, one of the largest sets of early modern medical records.  Kassell was the historical consultant for the 2019 video game Astrologaster, based on her work on Simon Forman.

Broadcasts
BBC Radio 4 In Our Time 'Alchemy' 24 February 2005.
BBC Radio 4 In Our Time 'Renaissance Astrology' 14 June 2007.
BBC Radio 4 In Our Time 'The Unicorn' 28 October 2010.

Selected publications
 Reproduction: Antiquity to the Present Day, Cambridge University Press, Cambridge, 2018. (co-editor and contributor) 
 Medicine and Magic in Elizabethan London: Simon Forman, Astrologer, Alchemist, and Physician. Clarendon Press, Oxford, 2005.

References 

Living people
American women historians
1970 births
American historians of science
Academics of the University of Cambridge
Alumni of the University of Oxford
Medical historians
21st-century American women